SOCS (suppressor of cytokine signaling proteins) refers to a family of genes involved in inhibiting the JAK-STAT signaling pathway.

Genes
 CISH
 SOCS1
 SOCS2
 SOCS3
 SOCS4
 SOCS5
 SOCS6
 SOCS7

Structure 
All SOCS have certain structures in common. This includes a varying N-terminal domain involved in protein-protein interactions, a central SH2 domain, which can bind to molecules that have been phosphorylated by tyrosine kinases, and a SOCS box located at the C-terminal that enables recruitment of E3 ligases and ubiquitin signaling molecules.

Discovery 
The first protein to be classified as a suppressor of cytokine signaling, CIS (cytokine-inducible SH2), was discovered in 1995, when it was found to have a unique ability to regulate cytokine signal transduction.

Function 
SOCS are negative regulators of the JAK-STAT signaling pathway. SOCS have also been implicated in the regulation of cytokines, growth factors, and tumor suppression.

Role in Disease 
It has been suggested that SOCS can help prevent cytokine-mediated apoptosis in diabetes through negative regulation of pro-inflammatory cytokines secreted by immune cells, such as IFNγ, TNFα and IL-15. Improper functioning of one specific SOCS, SOCS3 may lead to type 2 diabetes, as it has been found that SOCS3 plays an important role in proper leptin signaling.

References

External links
 

Cell signaling